USNS Richard E. Byrd (T-AKE-4) is a Lewis and Clark-class dry cargo ship in the United States Navy. She is the second United States Navy ship to be named after polar explorer Rear Admiral Richard E. Byrd (1888–1957).

The contract to build her was awarded to National Steel and Shipbuilding Company (NASSCO) of San Diego, California, on 18 July 2003.  She was launched from the building ways into the San Diego Bay on the evening of 15 May 2007; Bolling Byrd Clarke, Admiral Byrd's eldest daughter, broke the ceremonial bottle of champagne on the ship's bow to start the launch amid fireworks and fanfare.  Construction continued until the U.S. Navy accepted her on 14 November 2007.  Additional construction work continued until she was delivered to Military Sealift Command (MSC) for crewing and placed in service on 8 January 2008.

She completed a fitting-out period as well as multiple operational inspections and trials, including a full INSURV inspection on 27 March 2008.  A final period of modifications and design alterations was completed during a 70-day availability before full fleet introduction on 25 July 2008.  The ship joined the Pacific Fleet and predominantly operates in the Far East and Indian Ocean operation areas.

In May 2009, Richard E. Byrd was identified to conduct Pacific Partnership 2009 as a last minute replacement for the USS Dubuque (LPD-8), which was sidelined due to an outbreak of H1N1 virus.  Pacific Partnership 2009 visited American Samoa, Tonga, New Caledonia, Kiribati (Tarawa), and the Marshall Islands from June to September.  In the few weeks after being selected, the ship was outfitted with a quick-designed Reverse Osmosis Unit to make sufficient clean water while loitering in the remote waters and additional logistical items were brought aboard. Byrd embarked PHIBRON2 and staff, several NGOs, and allied partners during an at-sea transfer from USNS Amelia Earhart (T-AKE-6).   This embarkation swelled the crew size to over 300 persons, requiring a USCG waiver.  After completing the mission, the ship offloaded the embarked crew and Reverse Osmosis Unit and returned normal duties.  One of those duties included providing Humanitarian Assistance and Disaster Relief efforts to Padang, Indonesia, in October 2009.

Byrd completed 16 underway replenishment evolutions, delivering 210,000 gallons (800 m³) of fuel to Tomodachi-support ships.

In August 2014, the ship rescued nine Yemeni sailors from their stricken dhow in the Sea of Oman.

References

External links

 USS Richard E. Byrd (DDG-23) veterans' website 

 

Lewis and Clark-class dry cargo ships
2007 ships